Mujahidul Islam Khan Selim; (born on 16 April 1948) is a Bangladeshi communist politician. Khan Selim served as the President of Communist Party of Bangladesh.

Career 
Selim is also a Muktijoddha and is the leader of 1969 armed uprising of Students on Chittagong, He was elected as vice president of the Dhaka University Central students union (DUCSU) in post-independence Bangladesh.

In 1993, Selim was elected General Secretary of the Communist Party of Bangladesh at a time when most leaders had left the party following the collapse of the Soviet Union.

In 2012, Selim was elected President of the Communist Party of Bangladesh.

Selim received death threats on 5 December 2015 from Mission Jihadists.

References

External links

1948 births
Bengali communists
Living people
University of Dhaka alumni
Bangladeshi communists
Bangladeshi politicians